Bansin Pier (German: Seebrücke Bansin) – is a pier located in the coastal resort of Bansin, on the island of Usedom; in Germany. The pier stretches out from the Imperial Beach for  into the Baltic Sea. The pier has a length of 285 meters; 50 meters of which extends over the beach. The original pier existed before World War II, however storms and the poor upkeep of the pier caused the authorities to demolish it. The current pier was built in the second half of 1990.

References

Piers in Germany